Papoli or Papuli may refer to:

Papoli-ye Olya
Papoli-ye Vosta